Mühlbach or Muhlbach may refer to:

Places

Austria
Hohenwarth-Mühlbach am Manhartsberg, a town in the district of Hollabrunn in Lower Austria
Mühlbach am Hochkönig, a municipality in St. Johann im Pongau district, Salzburgerland
Mühlbach im Pinzgau, a village in Zell am See District, Salzburg

France
Muhlbach-sur-Munster (German: Mühlbach im Elsass), a commune Alsace
Muhlbach-sur-Bruche (German: Mühlbach an der Breusch), a commune in Alsace

Germany
Mühlbach, a small village in the municipality of Selb in Upper Franconia
Mühlbach, a district of the town Bad Neustadt in Lower Franconia
Mühlbach, Eppingen, a village in the town of Eppingen, Baden-Württemberg
Mühlbach, Karlstadt, a village in the town of Karlstadt am Main, Bavaria
Rieschweiler-Mühlbach, a municipality in Südwestpfalz district, in Rhineland-Palatinate
Mühlbach am Glan, part of Altenglan in the Kusel district in Rhineland-Palatinate
Mühlbach, part of Großkarolinenfeld in Bavaria
Mühlbach, part of Vachendorf in Bavaria

Italy
Mühlbach, South Tyrol, a municipality in South Tyrol

Luxembourg
Muhlbach, Luxembourg, part of Contern

Romania
the German name of Sebeș

Rivers in Germany
Mühlbach (Rur), of North Rhine-Westphalia
Ladbergener Mühlbach, of North Rhine-Westphalia
Mühlbach (Fichtenberger Rot), of Baden-Württemberg, tributary of the Fichtenberger Rot
Mühlbach (Schussen) of Baden-Württemberg, tributary of the Schussen
Mühlbach (Altmühl), of Bavaria, tributary of the Altmühl
Mühlbach (Gleiritsch), of Bavaria, tributary of the Gleiritsch
Mühlbach (Isar-Werkkanal), of Bavaria, tributary of the Isar
Mühlbach (Mangfall), of Bavaria, tributary of the Mangfall
Auer Mühlbach, of Bavaria
Zipser Mühlbach, of Bavaria
Maria-Einsiedel-Mühlbach, of Bavaria
Mühlbach, a man-made canal in Dachau, Bavaria
Mühlbach (Merkenfritzerbach), of Hesse, headstream of the Merkenfritzerbach
Mühlbach (Schwarzbach), of Hesse, tributary of the Schwarzbach
Mühlbach (Elbbach), of Hesse, tributary of the Elbbach

People with the surname
Luise Mühlbach (1814–1873), German writer best known for her works of historical fiction
Don Muhlbach (born 1981), American football long snapper